The Municipality of Brežice is a municipality in eastern Slovenia in the Lower Sava Valley along the border with Croatia. The seat of the municipality is the town of Brežice. The area was traditionally divided between Lower Styria (territory on the left bank of the Sava River) and Lower Carniola (territory on the right bank of the Sava River). The entire municipality is now included in the Lower Sava Statistical Region.

Geography
Brežice is one of the largest municipalities in Slovenia. It lies at the confluence of the Sava and Krka rivers and also stands at the junction of a number of international traffic routes.

Settlements
In addition to the municipal seat of Brežice, the municipality also includes the following settlements:

 Arnovo Selo
 Artiče
 Bizeljska Vas
 Bizeljsko
 Blatno
 Bojsno
 Boršt
 Bračna Vas
 Brezje pri Bojsnem
 Brezje pri Veliki Dolini
 Brezovica na Bizeljskem
 Brvi
 Bukošek
 Bukovje
 Bušeča Vas
 Čatež ob Savi
 Čedem
 Cerina
 Cerklje ob Krki
 Cirnik
 Črešnjice pri Cerkljah
 Cundrovec
 Curnovec
 Dečno Selo
 Dednja Vas
 Dobeno
 Dobova
 Dolenja Pirošica
 Dolenja Vas pri Artičah
 Dolenje Skopice
 Dramlja
 Drenovec pri Bukovju
 Dvorce
 Gabrje pri Dobovi
 Gaj
 Gazice
 Globočice
 Globoko
 Glogov Brod
 Gorenja Pirošica
 Gorenje Skopice
 Gornji Lenart
 Gregovce
 Hrastje pri Cerkljah
 Izvir
 Jereslavec
 Jesenice
 Kamence
 Kapele
 Koritno
 Kraška Vas
 Križe
 Krška Vas
 Laze
 Loče
 Mala Dolina
 Mali Cirnik
 Mali Obrež
 Mali Vrh
 Mihalovec
 Mostec
 Mrzlava Vas
 Nova Vas ob Sotli
 Nova Vas pri Mokricah
 Obrežje
 Oklukova Gora
 Orešje na Bizeljskem
 Pavlova Vas
 Pečice
 Perišče
 Piršenbreg
 Pišece
 Podgorje pri Pišecah
 Podgračeno
 Podvinje
 Ponikve
 Poštena Vas
 Prilipe
 Račja Vas
 Rajec
 Rakovec
 Ribnica
 Rigonce
 Sela pri Dobovi
 Silovec
 Slogonsko
 Slovenska Vas
 Sobenja Vas
 Spodnja Pohanca
 Sromlje
 Stankovo
 Stara Vas–Bizeljsko
 Stojanski Vrh
 Trebež
 Velika Dolina
 Velike Malence
 Veliki Obrež
 Vinji Vrh
 Vitna Vas
 Volčje
 Vrhje
 Vrhovska Vas
 Zasap
 Žejno
 Zgornja Pohanca
 Zgornji Obrež
 Župeča Vas
 Župelevec

Tourism
The area's many hot springs have contributed to the development of the largest natural spa and the second largest tourist center in Slovenia, Čateške Toplice (the Terme Čatež Thermal Health Resort). The Municipality of Brežice also offers visitors recreation and entertainment, as well as sports including hunting and fishing. The surrounding hills are ideal for fruit growing and viticulture. The vineyards of the Bizeljsko and Pišece districts are renowned for their top-quality wines.

References

External links

 Municipality of Brežice on Geopedia
 Brežice municipal website

 
Brezice
Brezice
1994 establishments in Slovenia